Vortex Spring is a commercially operated recreation, camping and dive park located near Ponce de Leon, Florida. It is the largest diving facility in the state of Florida.

The spring
The spring consists of a  basin with sloping sides and a cave which links the spring to the Floridan aquifer. The spring runoff flows into nearby Otter Creek, which joins Sandy Creek a short distance upstream of Ponce de Leon Spring. There are many fish in the spring; large carp swim in the basin while freshwater eels live in the cave.

Diving
Vortex Spring is a popular diving area both for experienced and novice divers. Dive training is offered at the park. A handrail is mounted along the wall of the cave.

The site
At the site, many facilities are provided for visitors. Lodging, dive shop, and changing rooms with heated showers are on site. Recreational features include diving boards, rope swings, and slides into the swimming area. Camping facilities, picnic areas, a basketball court, volleyball court, paddle boats, floats, and canoes are also provided.

History

The cave has been a controversial aspect of the spring. During the early 1990s, 13 divers died while exploring it. The state of Florida threatened to ban diving near cave entrances as a result of frequent cave diving accidents, but local divers responded by developing a special cave diving certification that became the standard requirement for sections of underwater caves known to be particularly hazardous. Vortex Spring complied with this by erecting a locked underwater gate at the entrance to the dangerous section of the cave. Only those who have valid cave diving certificates are permitted to enter, requiring a staff member to unlock the gate, and typically accompany them during the dive.

In 2010,  Ben McDaniel , a diver who was not certified for cave diving, but had been witnessed by staff and other divers gaining access to the restricted area of the cave by forcing open the gate, did not resurface after an employee let him through the gate one evening. It was initially assumed that he had died accidentally after becoming trapped underwater, but extensive searches did not find his body, nor any sign that one was present in the remote recesses of the cave.

The only significant evidence that was found were two decompression tanks filled with plain air (rather than the standard mixtures of gases normally used for diving in such conditions). The discovery of the tanks raised suspicions further because, in addition to being filled with the wrong type of gas, they were found just outside the entrance to the cave, though experienced divers know to place tanks close by to the areas they'll be exploring further down, thus keeping them within easy reach in case of emergency. This was seen as odd, considering that McDaniel was last seen deep inside the cave, attempting to bypass the gate to the restricted section by a diving staff member exiting the cave, who then unlocked it for him despite his lack of certification or diving partner. The staff diver then left, witnessing McDaniel entering the restricted zone.

It has been speculated that he may have been murdered (especially after the similarly suspicious death of Vortex Spring owner Lowell Kelly late the following year), and that his body was disposed of elsewhere. Another theory is that McDaniel staged his own disappearance to start a new life free from the many personal and financial problems he had been having at the time. Yet another possibility is that McDaniel did simply die by accident, and that his body still lies somewhere in the deepest parts of the cave, which are extremely difficult to access.

In 2012, another diver died in the cave, believed by those who recovered him to have been searching for McDaniel's body, motivated by a large reward offered by McDaniel's parents, which they rescinded after news of the event.

Nearby springs
 Beckton Spring
 Jackson Blue Spring
 Ponce de Leon Springs State Park
 Cypress Spring
 Morrison Spring

References

External links
Vortex Official Site
Underwater Florida's page on Vortex Spring

Underwater diving sites in the United States
Tourist attractions in Holmes County, Florida
Cave diving